The 1943 Swedish Ice Hockey Championship was the 21st season of the Swedish Ice Hockey Championship, the national championship of Sweden. Hammarby IF won the championship.

Tournament

Qualification 
 BK Forward - Nacka SK 1:4
 Forshaga IF - Tranebergs IF 0:2
 Mora IK - Brobergs IF 5:3
 Wifsta/Östrands IF - IFK Nyland 4:1
 Brynäs IF - IF Vesta 9:2
 IF Verrdandi - Norrköpings AIS (W)  
 Surahammars IF - UoIF Matteuspojkarna 0:3
 AIK - VIK Västerås HK 5:2

First round
 AIK - Norrköpings AIS (W)
 Mora IK - Brynäs IF 1:0
 Karlbergs BK - Nacka SK 1:5
 Wifsta/Östrands IF - IK Göta 0:1
 Reymersholms IK - Årsta SK 2:3
 Tranebergs IF - UoIF Matteuspojkarna 2:3

Quarterfinals 
 Mora IK - Hammarby IF 1:7
 UoIF Matteuspojkarna - Södertälje SK 4:6
 Årsta SK - IK Göta 1:8
 Nacka SK - AIK 3:7

Semifinals
 Hammarby IF - Södertälje SK 3:2
 IK Göta - AIK 4:3

Final 
 Hammarby IF - IK Göta 4:1

External links
 Season on hockeyarchives.info

Cham
Swedish Ice Hockey Championship seasons